Amin Abu Rashid, nicknamed "Amin Abu-Ibrahim" (born ), is a Palestinian-Dutch national, best known for his activism for Hamas and Gaza-bound flotillas.

According to a U.S. government exhibit and other sources, Rashid was a member of the Al-Aqsa Foundation in Rotterdam. In 2009, the Palestine News Network reported that Rashid was the Secretary General of the Popular Forum in the Netherlands. In December 2009, Middle East Monitor described him as the head of a delegation from the Conference of Palestinians in Europe.

Role in Gaza-bound flotillas
De Telegraaf reported in June 2011, that Rashid had arranged financing and the purchase of a ship for the flotilla, and trained with the crew. As a second flotilla was being formed in June 2011, Israeli Public Affairs and Diplomacy Minister Yuli Edelstein said that: The participation of Hamas member Amin Abu Rashid in the flotilla, who is known for fundraising money for Hamas terror operations, is clear proof that this is not a humanitarian flotilla, but a provocation and a terror operation in disguise of a flotilla. In the previous flotilla, Abu Rashid expressed his intentions to clash with IDF soldiers and we must take into account that this will be his intention in the current flotilla.

References

Living people
Palestinians
Dutch businesspeople
Chief financial officers
Gaza flotilla raid
Year of birth missing (living people)